Tian Guojun (born 10 March 1990) is a Chinese speed-skater.

Tian competed at the 2014 Winter Olympics for China. In the 1000 metres he finished 34th overall, and in the 1500 metres he finished 21st.

Tian made his World Cup debut in November 2013. As of September 2014, Tian's top World Cup finish is 4th in a 1000m B race at Berlin in 2013–14. His best overall finish in the World Cup is 40th, in the 1000 metres in 2013–14.

References 

1990 births
Living people
Chinese male speed skaters
Speed skaters at the 2014 Winter Olympics
Olympic speed skaters of China
People from Anda
21st-century Chinese people